The armour eelgoby (Amblyotrypauchen arctocephalus) is a species of goby found from the Indian Ocean waters around India to the western Pacific Ocean where it occurs at depths of from .  This species is currently the only known member of its genus.

References

Amblyopinae
Fish described in 1890